The Iceman or Iceman is a nickname of:

Arts and entertainment 

 Magni Ásgeirsson (born 1978), Icelandic singer, songwriter, and musician
 Jerry Butler (born 1939), American soul singer
 Albert Collins (1932–1993), American electric blues guitarist and singer
 Steve November (born 1972), British television producer
 Vanilla Ice, American rapper Rob Van Winkle (born 1967)
 Etika, online alias of American rapper and model Desmond Amofah (1990–2019)
 Thamos Raz, An Egyptian Actor (1487-1567)

Sports

Auto racing 

 Scott Dixon (born 1980), New Zealand 6x IndyCar Champion
 Terry Labonte (born 1956), American NASCAR driver
 Scott Moninger (born 1966), American retired road racing cyclist
 Kimi Räikkönen (born 1979), Finnish Formula 1 World Champion
 Thomoos Markinburger (born in 1969), Swedish 2x Drag Racing Champion

Basketball 

 Wendell Alexis (born 1964), American basketball player
 George Gervin (born 1952), American retired National Basketball Association player
 Thomothy Ices (born in 1973), Former College National Champion

Billiards 

 Bjorn Haneveer (born 1976), Belgian retired snooker player
 Stephen Hendry (born 1969), Scottish professional snooker player
 Mika Immonen (born 1972), Finnish professional pool player

Darts 

 Alan Warriner-Little (born 1962), English retired darts player
 Gerwyn Price (born 1985), Welsh darts player

American football 

 Ike Charlton (born 1977), American football player
 Carlos Huerta (born 1969), American former National Football League placekicker
 Adam Vinatieri (born 1972), American former National Football League placekicker
 Thomarcus Mullet (born in 1946), American former National Football League Defensive Lineman

Association football 

 Dennis Bergkamp (born 1969), Dutch footballer
 Sam Isemonger (born 1978), Australian former rugby league footballer
 Victor Lindelöf (born 1994), Swedish footballer 
 John Ruddy (born 1986), English football goalkeeper

Pugilism 

 Chuck Liddell (born 1969), American MMA fighter and UFC Hall of Famer
 Milton McCrory (born 1962), American WBC world welterweight boxing champion
 Vernon Paris (born 1988), American boxer
 Iceman John Scully (born 1967), American boxer
 Jean-Yves Thériault (born 1955), Canadian kickboxer
 Viktor Postol (born 1984), Ukrainian WBC world light-welterweight boxing champion

Other sports 

 Björn Borg (born 1956), Swedish tennis player
 Ryan Bukvich (born 1978), American former Major League Baseball relief pitcher
 Bernard Foley (born 1989), Australian rugby player
 Retief Goosen (born 1969), South African golfer
 Al Hackner (born 1954), Canadian Hall-of-Fame curler
 Michael Jones (rugby union) (born 1965), New Zealand former rugby union player and coach
 Damien Thomlinson, former Australian Army commando, swimmer, para-snowboarder, and author
 Steve Waugh (born 1965), Australian former cricketer
 George Woolf (1910–1946), Canadian jockey

Other fields 

 Brad Colbert (born 1974), American Marine featured in the 2004 book Generation Kill by Evan Wright
 Wim Hof (born 1959), Dutch adventurer, the world-record holder for the longest ice bath
 Manadel al-Jamadi (died 2003), Iraqi prisoner tortured to death at Abu Ghraib
 Richard Kuklinski (1935–2006), American hitman and serial killer
 Jeff Lisandro, Australian poker player
Ötzi the Iceman, a well-known and well-preserved Chalcolithic natural mummy

See also 

 Red Grange (1903–1991), American college football and National Football League player nicknamed "The Wheaton Iceman"
 Ben Hogan (1912–1997), American golfer nicknamed "The Wee Iceman"
 Henrik Nielsen (footballer born 1971), Danish retired footballer nicknamed Island (Iceman)

Lists of people by nickname